Mappia racemosa is a species of plant in the Icacinaceae family. It is found in Cuba, the Dominican Republic, Guatemala, Haiti, Jamaica, Panama, and Puerto Rico. It is threatened by habitat loss.

References

racemosa
Vulnerable plants
Taxonomy articles created by Polbot